Left Behind: Rise of the Antichrist is a 2023 Canadian apocalyptic thriller drama film directed by Kevin Sorbo and co-written by Paul Lalonde. It stars Sorbo, Neal McDonough, Bailey Chase, Corbin Bernsen, Greg Perrow, Sarah FIsher, Sam Sorbo, Charles Sndrew Payn and Stafford Perry. It serves as a sequel to 2014 reboot Left Behind, which itself is based on the 1995 novel of the same name written by Tim LaHaye and Jerry B. Jenkins.

The film was released on January 26, 2023.

Synopsis

The world is in chaos six months after the Rapture took millions of people, and a new charismatic leader named Nicolae Carpathia is gaining prominence. Unclear whether he can be trusted or if he has a larger plan that involves the Tribulation, the world will soon know his name.

Cast

Production

Development
In April 2015, Paul LaLonde launched an Indiegogo crowdfunding campaign, asking for $500,000 in contributions.  In July 2017, LaLonde announced on the film's Facebook page that he has purchased the rights to all 16 books of the series. He explained that he had been "handcuffed" to the first two books in the series and will now be able to finally tell the story with a plan for a series of 7 films covering the books in their entirety.

Casting and filming 
All cast members from the previous film were recast. Sorbo replaces Nicolas Cage as Rayford Steele, while Greg Perrow, Sarah Fisher, Kathryn Kohut, and Charles Andrew Payne replace Chad Michael Murray, Cassi Thomson, Nicky Whelan, and Lance E. Nichols as Cameron "Buck" Williams, Chloe Steele, Hattie Durham, and Bruce Barnes, respectively. David LeReaney plays Chaim Rosenzweig, Sorbo's wife Sam Sorbo, plays Amanda White, and Linda Kee plays Ivy Gold, a character who is not from the books, having first appeared in the original Left Behind film played by Krista Bridges. Sorbo revealed that he was initially approached seven years ago to replace Cage for the role, but came onboard when it was time to go into production as he felt that "it just seems like the time is right".

Principal photography took place in Calgary, Alberta for 19 days in late fall 2021.

Release
Left Behind: Rise of the Antichrist was scheduled to be release in October 2022, but was pushed back. It was released from January 26 to January 29, 2023 in partnership with Fathom Events.  The film was distributed worldwide by 101 Films International. 

The film surpassed $3 million at the box in Canada and the United States. It will be released on Blu-ray and DVD on March 21, 2023.

Reception
Michael Foust writing for the website Crosswalk.com gave the film an entertainment rating of 3 out of 5, stating that the film is "one-third a thriller film, one-third an apologetics lesson, and one-third a sermon", ultimately concluding that "Rise of the Antichrist is the best Left Behind movie yet, even if it does include one or two moments of “cheese” that briefly distract from the plot."

Chris Willman of Variety states that while "the latest installment in the rapture franchise provides efficient filmmaking at times", in the end it "doesn't offer much movie rapture on the way to an altar-call epilogue."

References

External links
 
 
 

Films based on works by Tim LaHaye
Films based on works by Jerry B. Jenkins
Left Behind series
2023 films
2023 drama films
2023 thriller films
2023 thriller drama films
2020s disaster films
2023 fantasy films
Films about the rapture
Canadian thriller drama films
Canadian disaster films
Canadian fantasy films
Apocalyptic films
Christian apocalyptic films